The Indus Telefilm Festival was a Pakistani film festival held in 2003. The festival showed films that had been filmed in the previous year. Seven films were shortlisted for the main competition, the winner of which received a prize of Rs 500,000.

The event was the first of its kind by the Indus TV Network to promote creativity in storytelling among amateurs as well as professionals, producers and directors. Iqbal Ansari, Director Programmes of Indus TV Network remarked at the conclusion of the Indus Telefilm Festival 2003. "It's up to the director to have the courage to explore various methods. Our objective, which was to encourage diversity of direction and content treatment, was achieved."

Jury 
The festival had a jury comprising writers, directors, actors and journalists to judge the three best telefilms. The jury included Ashfaq Ahmed, Bano Qudsia, Talat Hussain, Kanwar Aftab Ahmad, Shafiq Ahmed, Iqbal Ansari, Khursheed Haider and Noorul Huda Shah.

Winners 
 Kamran Qureshi - First Winner: Best TV Film and Director for Murad with cash prize PKR 500,000/-
 Mehreen Jabbar - Second Winner: Best TV Film and Director for Marhoom Colonel Ki Baitiaan with cash prize PKR 200,000/-
 Faisal Rehman - Third Winner: Best TV Film and Director for World Ka Center with cash prize PKR 100,000/-

See also

 List of Asian television awards
 The 1st Indus Drama Awards
 Lux Style Awards
 Hum Awards

References

External links 
 
 Facebook: Indus Telefilm Festival

2003 television awards
Awards established in 2003
Festivals in Karachi
Pakistani television awards
Film festivals in Pakistan